The 2009–10 Short Track Speed Skating World Cup was a multi-race tournament over a season for short track speed skating. The season began on 17 September 2009 and ended on 15 November 2009. The World Cup was organised by the ISU who also ran world cups and championships in speed skating and figure skating.

The World Cup consisted of just four competitions this year (rather than six) due to the 2010 Winter Olympics in Vancouver.

Calendar

Men

China

South Korea

Canada

United States

Women

China

South Korea

Canada

United States

Overall standings
 note: the overall standings are a combination of the athletes best three results over the season

Men

Women

References
ISU International Skating Union Results Site

ISU Short Track Speed Skating World Cup
2009 in short track speed skating
2010 in short track speed skating